The eighth series of Made in Chelsea, a British structured-reality television programme, began airing on 13 October 2014 on E4. The series concluded on 15 December 2014 after 10 episodes. A Christmas special episode aired immediately after the series on 22 December 2014, which was then followed by an end of season special presented by Rick Edwards on 29 December 2014. This is the first series to feature new main cast members Josh Shepherd, Lauren Frazer-Hutton, Tiff Watson and Lonan O'Herlihy, and was the only series to include cast members George Amor and Will Colebrook after they did not return for the ninth series. Lauren was introduced as the new girlfriend of already established cast member Spencer Matthews, whilst Tiffany is the sister of Lucy Watson. The series focused on Spencer and Laurens relationship, an ongoing argument between Binky and Fran, the romance between Alik and Louise, and Sam attempting to win back Tiffany following several cheating allegations.

Cast

Episodes

{| class="wikitable plainrowheaders" style="width:100%; background:#fff;"
|- style="color:white"
! style="background: #58ACFA;"| SeriesNo.
! style="background: #58ACFA;"| EpisodeNo.
! style="background: #58ACFA;"| Title
! style="background: #58ACFA;"| Original airdate
! style="background: #58ACFA;"| Duration
! style="background: #58ACFA;"| UK viewers

|}

Ratings

External links

References

2014 British television seasons
Made in Chelsea seasons